Michel Leblanc (born 17 December 1959) is a Canadian-born French former ice hockey player. He competed in the men's tournaments at the 1988 Winter Olympics and the 1992 Winter Olympics for France.

References

External links

1959 births
Living people
Anglet Hormadi Élite players
Canadian ice hockey defencemen
Diables Noirs de Tours players
Diables Rouges de Briançon players
Dragons de Rouen players
French ice hockey defencemen
Ice hockey people from Quebec
Ice hockey players at the 1988 Winter Olympics
Ice hockey players at the 1992 Winter Olympics
Olympic ice hockey players of France
Rapaces de Gap players
Sportspeople from Trois-Rivières
Trois-Rivières Draveurs players